Yevgeni Petrovich Shurko (born 9 November 1972 in Kurgan) is a Russian football coach and a former player.

Shurko played in the Russian Premier League with FC Lokomotiv Nizhny Novgorod.

References

1972 births
People from Kurgan, Kurgan Oblast
Living people
Soviet footballers
Russian footballers
FC Tobol Kurgan players
FC Lokomotiv Nizhny Novgorod players
Russian Premier League players
FC Irtysh Omsk players
Russian football managers
Association football defenders
Sportspeople from Kurgan Oblast